Mississippi Rhythm is a 1949 American musical film directed by Derwin Abrahams and written by Gretchen Darling. The film stars Jimmie Davis, Veda Ann Borg, Lee White, Sue England, James Flavin and Paul Maxey. The film was released on May 29, 1949, by Monogram Pictures.

Plot

Cast          
Jimmie Davis as Jimmie Davis
Veda Ann Borg as Jeanette
Lee White as Dixie Dalrymple
Sue England as Dorothy Kenworthy
James Flavin as Stan Caldwell
Paul Maxey as Judge Kenworthy
Paul Bryar as Sad Sam Beale
Joel Marston as Duke McCall
Guy Beach as Pop Lassiter

References

External links
 

1949 films
American musical films
1949 musical films
Monogram Pictures films
Films directed by Derwin Abrahams
American black-and-white films
1940s English-language films
1940s American films